SERE may refer to two related military training programs:

 Survive, Evade, Resist, Extract training, United Kingdom
 Survival, Evasion, Resistance and Escape training, United States
 "SERE" (The Unit), an episode of the television series The Unit which centers on such a training exercise

See also
 Sere (disambiguation)